The 1973 Cork Intermediate Football Championship was the 38th staging of the Cork Intermediate Football Championship since its establishment by the Cork County Board in 1909. The draw for the opening round fixtures took place on 28 January 1973. 

The final was played on 5 August 1973 at the Athletic Grounds in Cork, between Canovee and Glanworth, in what was their first ever meeting in the final. Canovee won the match by 2-11 to 0-06 to claim their first ever championship title.

Results

Final

Championship statistics

Miscellaneous

 Nine players on the Canovee team completed the double after they also lined out with Cloughduv who won the 1973 Cork IHC.

References

Cork Intermediate Football Championship